Miro is a game manufacturer in France. Its most notable publication is "La Conquête du Monde," the first version of Risk ever produced.

History

Miro was founded in Paris in 1936 by Fred Mirowitch and Leo J. Frankenthal. The company changed hands in 1950, after which it became the producer of French-language versions of Waddington Ltd. and Parker Brothers games. In 1980, Miro Company merged with Parker Brothers France and Meccano France under the name Miro-Meccano. In 1986, the company was acquired by Hasbro.

References

Board game publishing companies
Publishing companies of France